Koomen is a Dutch surname. It is possibly of patronymic or of occupational origin; the latter via Kooman from Koopman ("merchant"). People with this surname include:

Bert Koomen (born 1997), Dutch football defender
Pete Koomen (born 1980s), American software developer, co-founder of Optimizely
Philip Koomen (born 1953), British furniture designer and maker
Stijn Koomen (born 1987), Dutch television and film actor
 (1929–1984), Dutch sports reporter on radio and television

See also
Koomen, alternate name of the former settlement of Panamenik, California
Kooman, surname
Komen (disambiguation)
Comet Howard–Koomen–Michels, a large sungrazer

References

Dutch-language surnames